Village Creek State Park can refer to either of two state parks in the United States:

Village Creek State Park (Arkansas)
Village Creek State Park (Texas)